"Cash Flow" is the debut single from rapper Ace Hood's debut album Gutta. It is a hip hop song that features T-Pain, Rick Ross and DJ Khaled with a quick intro. DJ Khaled is not credited in "Cash Flow". It is produced by The Runners.

Music video
The music video was released on May 1, 2008. It features cameos from  Felicia Pearson, Fat Joe, DJ Nasty, Flo Rida, Fabolous, Brisco, Triple C's, Trick Daddy, Dunk Ryders, The Runners, Bali (The Runners' artist), Pitbull and Birdman.

Charts

References

2008 songs
Ace Hood songs
T-Pain songs
Rick Ross songs
2008 debut singles
Songs written by Ace Hood
Songs written by Kevin Cossom
Songs written by Rick Ross
Songs written by Jermaine Jackson (hip hop producer)
Songs written by Andrew Harr
Song recordings produced by the Runners
Def Jam Recordings singles
Gangsta rap songs
Songs written by DJ Khaled
Songs written by T-Pain